Omobranchus mekranensis, the Mekran blenny, is a species of combtooth blenny found in the western Indian ocean.  This species can grow to a length of  TL.

References

mekranensis
Taxa named by Charles Tate Regan
Fish described in 1905